Stebbing is an English village.

Stebbing may also refer to:

People with the surname
Edward Percy Stebbing (1872–1960), pioneering British forester and forest entomologist in India
Gary Stebbing (born 1965), English professional football player
Henry Stebbing (1687–1763), English churchman and controversialist
Henry Stebbing (editor) (1799–1883), English cleric and man of letters
Susan Stebbing, (1885–1943), British philosopher
Thomas Roscoe Rede Stebbing (1835–1926), English zoologist

See also
Stebbings, a surname